Jack Reginald Sambell (20 May 1908 – 22 August 1982) was an Australian rules footballer who played with Melbourne in the Victorian Football League (VFL).

Family
The second son of Edgar Shadforth Tremayne Sambell (1880-1950), and Barbara Katherine Sambell (1879-1963), née McPhee, Jack Reginald Sambell was born at Violet Town, Victoria, on 20 May 1908.

He married Vera May Howard (1907-1941) in 1935; she died giving birth to a stillborn child on 22 January 1941.

He married Mary Irene Healy (1905-2000) in 1942.

Football
Transferred from Glen Iris, in the Eastern Suburbs League, in May 1932, he played in Yallourn's 1932 Gippsland Football League premiership, and won their club best and fairest award, before he was transferred to Melbourne by the Education Department in early 1933.

Death
He died at Fitzroy, Victoria on 22 August 1982.

Notes

References
 Technical Schools: Examination Results: Trained Secondary Teachers' Certificate: Melbourne Teachers' College, The Argus, (Tuesday, 17 January 1928), p.11.
 Football Appeal: Alleged Ineligibility: Euroa Club Protest Dismissed by Council: Match Awarded to Longwood, The Shepparton Advertiser, (Monday, 13 October 1930), p.3. 
 League Permits: Many Players Transfer, The Age, (Thursday, 9 April 1936), p.14.
 World War Two: Service Record (Militia): Jack Reginald Sambell (214673), National Archives of Australia.

External links 

 
 
 Jack Sambell's profile at Demonwiki.
 Jack Sambell, at The VFA Project.

1908 births
Australian rules footballers from Victoria (Australia)
Melbourne Football Club players
1982 deaths